Santos Futebol Clube, commonly known as Santos or Sereias da Vila, is a Brazilian women's association football club, based in the city of Santos, São Paulo state, Brazil. They won the Campeonato Brasileiro de Futebol Feminino once, the Copa do Brasil twice and the Copa Libertadores Femenina twice.

History
The club was created in 1997 as part of Santos, in a partnership with Fundação Pró-Esportes de Santos (Fupes). They won two national competitions, which are the Liga Nacional in 2007, the Copa do Brasil in 2008. The club won the Copa Mercosul in 2006, and the Campeonato Paulista in 2007. The Campeonato Paulista organized by LINAF was won by Santos in 2009, beating Corinthians in the final. Santos competed in the 2009 Copa Libertadores, winning the competition after beating Universidad Autónoma of Paraguay 9–0 in the final, played on October 18. They won the 2009 Copa do Brasil on December 1, 2009, after beating Botucatu 3–0 in the final, played at Estádio do Pacaembu. In 2010, they won again the Copa Libertadores, after beating Everton 1–0 in Arena Barueri, and in 2011 they won the Campeonato Paulista again, after they beat Centro Olímpico in the final.

Closure 2012
The women's section was closed in 2012. The club's president Luis Álvaro de Oliveira Ribeiro closed down the women's team and the men's futsal team because an alleged lack of sponsorship meant they were not self-sustaining. It was attributed to the effort of holding male star player Neymar at Santos.

2015 Reestablishment
In 2015 incoming Santos president Modesto Roma Júnior reinstated the women's team, as part of wider reforms aimed at repairing the previous regime's financial mismanagement.

Players

Current squad

Stadium

Santos play their home games at Estádio Vila Belmiro, hence the club's nickname Sereias da Vila, meaning Vila's Mermaids. The stadium has a maximum capacity of 16,798 people. They also play occasionally at neighbouring Estádio Ulrico Mursa, which is owned by Portuguesa Santista.

Honours
 Copa Libertadores Femenina:
 Winners (2): 2009, 2010
 Runners-up (1): 2018
 Campeonato Brasileiro de Futebol Feminino:
 Winners (1): 2017
 Copa do Brasil:
 Winners (2): 2008, 2009
 Liga Nacional de Futebol Feminino:
 Winners (1): 2007
 Campeonato Paulista:
 Winners (4): 2007, 2010, 2011, 2018
 Runners-up (4): 2009, 2016, 2017, 2022
 :
 Winners (1): 2020
 Regional Games:
 Winners (3): 2006, 2007, 2008

References

External links
 Official website

Santos FC
Women's football clubs in Brazil
Association football clubs established in 1997
1997 establishments in Brazil